Scar the Martyr is the only album by the American heavy metal band Scar the Martyr, released on October 1, 2013.

Writing and recording
The album was mostly written by former Slipknot drummer Joey Jordison, who formed the band alongside Blood Promise frontman Henry Derek Bonner in early 2013. Jordison performed all drums, bass and the majority of rhythm guitars on the album before bringing in Chris Vrenna (formerly of Nine Inch Nails and Marilyn Manson) to perform keyboards, and Kris Norris (formerly of Darkest Hour) and Jed Simon (formerly of Strapping Young Lad) to perform lead guitar duties. The first song released from the album, Blood Host, was released on August 2, 2013. The second song, Soul Disintegration, was released alongside the album artwork on August 16, 2013.

Critical reception

The album was met with positive reviews by critics; however, specific aspects of the album's construction and overall tone were met with divided opinions.

Sputnikmusic stated that the album's sound appeared to include many elements from Slipknot, the differences being that Derek's vocal style is more varied and has not come across as a Corey Taylor clone and that the keyboards used aided in creating eerie atmospheres which aided the industrial sounding guitars, the main set-back being that with the extended length of a relatively small number of tracks, the album was too long and should have been shortened.

Renowned for Sound called the band a "supergroup" since the band's members, with the exception of Henry Derek, were all prominent musicians prior to the band's formation. The review praised the album's lyrics and the mix of heavy guitar riffs and solos, which followed along to a simple yet very well structured drum beat; however, they stated the role of the keyboards were very minor throughout the album.

Review by Bring the Noise gave the album a positive review, praising the horror-themed atmospheric tones and stated that the album consisted of catchy choruses and rhythmic guitar patterns. They also praised the use of powerful lyrics and complimented the vocal talent of Derek, and that the electro/retro elements had a very strong yet not overpowering presence in the album.

As of January 2014, it sold roughly 11,000 copies in US only.

Track listing

Personnel

Scar the Martyr
Henry Derek – vocals, rhythm guitar on "Cruel Ocean" and "White Nights in a Day Room"
Jed Simon – lead guitar
Kris Norris – lead guitar
Joey Jordison – drums, percussion, bass, rhythm guitar

Additional musicians
Chris Vrenna – keyboards, programming
Rhys Fulber - additional programming

Production
Produced by Rhys Fulber
Co-produced by Joey Jordison
Engineered by Ryan Martin
Mixed by Zeuss
Mastered by Alan Douches
Jarosław Baran - digital editing
John Cranfield - digital editing
Travis Smith - album art, design
Justin Borucki - band photography
Neil Zaugg - Chris Vrenna photograph
Amanda Victoria - production assistant

References 

2013 debut albums
Scar the Martyr albums
Roadrunner Records albums
Albums produced by Rhys Fulber